Élisabeth Sophie Chéron (3 October 1648, in Paris – 3 September 1711, in Paris) is remembered today primarily as a French painter, but she was a renaissance woman, acclaimed in her lifetime as a gifted poet, musician, artist, and academician.

Life

She was trained by her artist father, while still a child, in the arts of enamelling and miniature painting.  Her father was a rigid Calvinist, and endeavored to influence his daughter to adopt his religious belief, but her mother was a fervent Roman Catholic, and she persuaded Elizabeth to pass a year in a convent, during which time she ardently embraced the Catholic faith. At 22 in 1670 she was admitted to the Académie Royale de Peinture et de Sculpture as a portrait painter under the sponsorship of the influential artist Charles Le Brun. She was the fourth woman painter to enter the academy, nine years after Catherine Girardon, and three years after Madeleine and Geneviève, the two daughters of Louis de Boullogne.

She exhibited regularly at the Salon, and at the same time produced poetry and translations. She was fluent in Hebrew, Greek, and Latin. Her literary talent was recognized in 1699 when she was named a member of the Accademia dei Ricovrati, in Padua, under the academician name of Erato. Her Psalms were later set to music by Jean-Baptiste Drouard de Bousset and Antonia Bembo, a Venetian noblewoman.

She was an affectionate daughter to both her parents and devoted her earnings to her brother Louis, who studied art in Italy. She was indifferent to proposals of marriage throughout her life, many from brilliant men in her intellectual circle. In 1708, at age 60, and to the surprise of her friends she married Jacques Le Hay, the King's engineer, after which she was known as Madame Le Hay.

She died aged 62 and is buried in the Church of Saint-Sulpice, Paris. The following lines are placed beneath her portrait in the church: 
"The unusual possession of two exquisite talents will render Cheron an ornament to France for all time. Nothing save the grace of her brush could equal the excellencies of her pen."

Works
Especially well known are her portrait of Antoinette Deshoulières and her Descent from the Cross.
Her notable writings are: 
Livre des Principes à Dessiner, 1706 ; A book of principles in drawing,
Psaumes et Cantiques mis en vers, 1694 ; Psalms and Canticles,
Le Cantique d'Habacuc et le Psaume, traduit en vers; The Song of Habakkuk and the Psalm, verse translated;
Les Cerises Renversées,  a small poem published in 1717 after her death, and put into Latin verse by Raux, in 1797.

Notes

References
CHÉRON, Elizabeth Sophie Essay de Pseaumes mis en vers. Paris Michel Brunet 1694 listed on Bibliopoly by Martayan Lan, Inc. Accessed December 2007.
CHERON, ELIZABETH SOPHIE at Women in the fine arts, from the Seventh Century B.C. to the Twentieth Century A.D. by Clara Erskine Clement, Part 2 out of 7 (1904). Accessed December 2007. At project Gutenberg

1648 births
1711 deaths
17th-century French painters
18th-century French painters
French women poets
Painters from Paris
Writers from Paris
Musicians from Paris
French women painters
17th-century French women artists
18th-century French women artists
17th-century French poets
18th-century French poets
Portrait painters
17th-century French women writers
18th-century French women writers